James Williams may refer to:

Entertainment
 James J. Williams (1853–1926), English photographer
 James Dixon Williams (1877–1934), American film producer
 James Williams (musician) (1951–2004), American jazz pianist
 James D-Train Williams (born 1962), American singer, songwriter and musician
 James K. Williams, Liberian rapper
 J. R. Williams (James Robert Williams), Canadian cartoonist

Military
 James Williams (Revolutionary War) (1740–1780), colonel from South Carolina
 James Monroe Williams (1833–1907), American Civil War soldier
 James Howard Williams (1897–1958), British soldier and elephant expert in Burma
 James E. Williams (1930–1999), Medal of Honor in the U.S. Navy
 James A. Williams (born 1932), U.S. Army general
 James L. Williams, commanding general of the 4th Marine Division

Politics
 James Wray Williams (1792–1842), U.S. Representative from Maryland
 James Williams (ambassador) (1796–1869), to Ottoman Empire
 James D. Williams (1808–1880), U.S. Representative from Indiana
 James Williams (Ohio politician) (1822–1892), Republican
 James Williams (Delaware politician) (1825–1899), U.S. Representative
 James E. Williams (Atlanta mayor) (1826–1900), Atlanta mayor after the Civil War
 James E. Williams (East St. Louis mayor)
 James M. Williams (1850–1909), Ohio House and Ohio Senate
 James R. Williams (politician) (1850–1923), U.S. Representative from Illinois
 James R. Williams (lawyer) (born 1936), candidate for lieutenant governor of Ohio
 James D. Williams (Pennsylvania politician) (1943–1985), Pennsylvania House
 James Edwin Williams (1856–1917), British trade unionist
 James Williams (labor leader), American president of painters' union
 James Harrison Williams, member of the Iowa House of Representatives

Religion
 James Williams (priest, died 1872) (1790–1872), Welsh clergyman
 James Williams (bishop) (1825–1892), Canadian Church of England
 James Williams (archdeacon of Ardfert) (died 1724)
 James Williams (archdeacon of Wrexham)
 James Kendrick Williams (born 1936), American Catholic bishop

Sports

American football
 James Williams (end) (1928–2015), Rice University
 James Williams (defensive back) (born 1967), Buffalo Bills
 Jamie Williams (American football) (born 1960), NFL tight end
 James Williams (wide receiver) (born 1978)
 James O. Williams (born 1968), American football offensive tackle for the Chicago Bears
 James Williams (linebacker) (born 1968), American football player

Association football
 James Williams (Welsh footballer) (1885–1916)
 James Williams (Australian footballer) (born 1937)
 James Williams-Richardson (born 1988), Anguillan international footballer
 James Williams (Irish footballer)
 Jimmy Williams (footballer, born 1982), English footballer

Other sports
 James Williams (baseball), co-owner of the Cincinnati Reds baseball team
 James Williams (basketball) (born 1979), American
 James Williams (British fencer) (born 1966)
 James Williams (cricketer) (born 1973), Welsh
 James Williams (field hockey) (1878–1929), British
 Jimmy Williams (coach) (James Bernard Williams, 1926–2016), minor league baseball manager
 Fly Williams (James Williams, born 1953), American basketball player
 James Leighman Williams (born 1985), American fencer

Other uses
 James Miller Williams (1818–1890), Canadian oil businessman
 James Nelson Williams (1837–1915), New Zealand runholder, orchardist and entrepreneur
 James Leon Williams (1852–1932), American dental researcher 
 James Steele Williams (1896–1957), American paleontologist
 James Arthur Williams (1930–1990), American antiques dealer
 James Wilson Williams (born 1982), American academic 
 James Oladipo Williams (died 1999), Nigerian jurist and judge
 James F. Williams, American librarian, University of Colorado
 James H. Williams Jr., American mechanical engineer, MIT
 Jamie Williams, president of the Wilderness Society
 USS James E. Williams, an Arleigh Burke-class destroyer in the United States Navy

See also
 Jim Williams (disambiguation)
 William James (disambiguation)